May 17 Movement is a prominent Tamil National Civil rights movement fighting for the justice for the Tamil Genocide in Tamil Eelam & the rights of Tamils in Tamil Nadu.

History
May 17 Movement was formed in May 2009 during the war in Sri Lanka when thousands of Tamils were killed. It was founded by activist Thirumurugan Gandhi in 2009. It is a Tamil nationalism movement based in Tamil Nadu, works for Worldwide Tamil people and caste annihilation. This is the only active movement actively involved in the exposing the controversial TFA(Trade Facilitation Agreement) policy of the World Trade Organization (WTO) accepted and signed by the Government of India.

May 17 movement consistently advocates for the liberation of Tamil Eelam, a separate state of Eelam Tamils. It has also spoken in the Geneva human rights sessions in the United Nations (UN) since 2015, in support of the nations without states, indigenous peoples and communities which have faced war crimes against the imperial forces. Led by Thirumurugan Gandhi, it has represented the Tamil civil society in Permanent Peoples' Tribunal for Sri Lanka in Bremen, Germany in 2013.

May 17 Movement coordinates and Gathers all the people at Chennai Marina beach (Tamizhar Kadal) to conduct the candleLight Vigil on 3rd Sunday on the Month of May every Year to mark the remembrance of 2009 Tamil Eezham Genocide. Every Year leaders from various parties, and peoples from various demography across Tamil Nadu gathers for this event. Regardless of their political differences, all the leaders participate and mourn for the genocide happened for tamils and unanimously raise slogan for Liberation of Tamil Eezham as the only solution, and demand for the Referendum for Eezham.

References

External links
May 17 Movement Website
May 17 Movement Facebook page
May 17 Movement Twitter handle

Organisations based in Chennai
Human rights organisations based in India
Tamil organisations
2009 establishments in Tamil Nadu
Organizations established in 2009